The Supreme Education Council (abbreviated SEC) is a Qatari government agency responsible for education in Qatar. It was established in November 2002. It is responsible for overseeing and directing the education system in Qatar and, subsequently, all of the country's independent schools. At the time of its founding, it replaced the Ministry of Education, which has since had its responsibilities reduced to providing support for the country's private schools. The Ministry of Education's personnel were consolidated into the SEC in 2009. The Supreme Education Council was renamed to the Ministry of Education and Higher Education by a Amiri Decree in 2014.

Organization
The SEC is headed by Buthaina bint Ali Al Jabr Al Nuaimi, minister of education, and Hind bint Hamad bin Khalifa Al-Thani, the deputy minister.

Departmental bodies 
The SEC has ten departments. The three most important are:
The Education Institute – Is directly involved in the oversight and support of independent and semi-independent schools. It is responsible for developing curriculum standards and licensing private schools and pre-schools. It also prepares specialized development programmes for school administrators.
The Evaluation Institute – Conducts national assessments of student learning of independent K-12 schools and collates the data. The institute is also responsible for teacher licensing. 
The Higher Education Institute – Assists students in applying for colleges and provides assistance for international admission tests.

References

External links 
 
 Supreme Education Council e-learning program

Qatar
Educational organisations based in Qatar